"Jour de neige" is a 1988 song recorded by French singer Elsa Lunghini. Written by Pierre Grosz with a music composed by Vincent-Marie Bouvot and Georges Lunghini, it was released in November 1988 as the third single from her debut album Elsa. As for the previous three singles, it had a great success in France, reaching number two. Two years later, it was released in Italy and Spain in the languages of these countries.

Background
As for the other songs from Elsa's debut album, the lyrics were written by Pierre Grosz. The music was composed by Vincent-Marie Bouvot and Georges Lunghini, the singer's father.

The song was also recorded in Italian-language ("Gli anni miei") and Spanish-language ("Solo era un sueno"). All these versions are available on 1997 Elsa's best of Elsa, l'essentiel 1986-1993. Two remixed and extended versions, as well as two instrumental versions, feature on the various formats. The megamix club version is also available on the CD maxi for "Quelque chose dans mon cœur".

Video and performances
As the title suggests, the text is about the snow and the enjoyments that it brings. The music video was shot in the snow and the strict secondary school "Les Chassagnes", in Oullins, France, and was directed by Bernard Schmitt.

Elsa sang it live during her concert at the Olympia in 1990 and during the next concert. She also sang during her concert at the Bataclan in 1997. During the preparation of her concert at the European in 2005, the song was scheduled but, as it did not comply with the setlist, it was withdrawn.

Chart performances
In France, "Jour de neige" was successful, debuting straight to number 12 on the chart edition of 26 November 1988, and entered the top ten two weeks later, stayed there for 14 consecutive weeks, peaking at number two for non consecutive two weeks, being first blocked by but did not manage to dislodge Mylène Farmer's "Pourvu qu'elles soient douces", then David Hallyday's "High", which topped the chart then. It fell off the top 50 after 20 weeks, which was then Elsa's shortest single chart run in France. Therefore, Elsa's first four singles reached number one or number two on the chart. In 1989, the single achieved Gold disc status by the Syndicat National de l'Édition Phonographique. On the European Hot 100 Singles, it debuted at number 45 on 10 December 1988 and reached a peak of number nine on 28 January 1988. It peaked at number 32 on the European Airplay Top 50 where it charted for five weeks.

Track listings

 7" single
 "Jour de neige" — 3:59
 "Jour de neige" (instrumental) — 3:59

 12" maxi
 "Jour de neige" (megamix club) — 8:02
 "Jour de neige" (remix extended version) — 4:49
 "Jour de neige" (remix instrumental version) — 4:32

 CD maxi
 "Jour de neige" (megamix club) — 8:02
 "Quelque chose dans mon cœur" — 3:30
 "Jour de neige" (remix version longue) — 4:49

 7" single - Promo - Canada
 "Jour de neige" — 4:00

 7" single - Italy
 "Gli anni miei" — 4:00
 "Jamais nous" — 3:54

 7" single - Spain
 "Solo era un sueño (Jour de neige)" — 4:00
 "Jour de neige" — 4:00

Credits
Jean-Philippe Bonichon - mixing
Vincent-Marie Bouvot - arranger, producer
Claude Caudron - design
Dimitri - remix
Raymond Donnez - arranger
Bruno Fourrier - assistant mixing
Bruno Lambert - engineer
Georges Lunghini - producer
Nicolas Neidhardt - piano (megamix club)
Mixed at Studio Marcadet, Paris

Charts and sales

Weekly charts

Year-end charts

Certifications

Release history

References

1988 singles
Elsa Lunghini songs
Ariola Records singles
1988 songs
Songs about weather